The Attila was an English automobile produced from 1903 to 1906; the car, which was the creation of the Hunslet Engine Company of Leeds, was a three-cylinder 20hp craft.

See also
 List of car manufacturers of the United Kingdom

Cars introduced in 1903
1900s cars
Veteran vehicles
Vehicle manufacturing companies established in 1903
1903 establishments in England
Defunct motor vehicle manufacturers of England